Síle de Valera (born 17 December 1954) is an Irish former Fianna Fáil politician who served as Minister of State for Adult Education, Youth Affairs and Educational Disadvantage and Minister for Arts, Heritage, Gaeltacht and the Islands from 1997 to 2002. She served as a Teachta Dála (TD) from 1977 to 1981 and from 1987 to 2007. She was a Member of the European Parliament (MEP) for the Dublin constituency from 1979 to 1984.

Early and personal life
Síle de Valera was born in 1954, in Dublin, Ireland to Terence de Valera (1922–2007), the youngest child of Éamon de Valera, and his wife Phyllis Blake (1920–2002). She has a younger sister, Jane (1959). She was educated at Loreto College in Foxrock and at University College Dublin, where she qualified as a career guidance teacher. De Valera comes from a famous political family; she is the granddaughter of Éamon de Valera, the founder of Fianna Fáil, former Taoiseach and third President of Ireland. She is a niece of Vivion de Valera, a former Teachta Dála, and is a first cousin of Éamon Ó Cuív, a TD and former Minister.

Political career
De Valera was first elected to Dáil Éireann in the Fianna Fáil landslide victory at the 1977 general election. She was elected for the Dublin County Mid constituency, which included the Tallaght area of County Dublin, being the youngest TD elected at that election. In June 1979, she was elected to the European Parliament for a five-year term. Later that year she was one of the Fianna Fáil TDs who criticised the policies of Taoiseach Jack Lynch in relation to Northern Ireland, and was a prominent supporter of Charles Haughey, who succeeded him as Taoiseach in December 1979. She was highly critical of Margaret Thatcher and the UK Government, and became a noted supporter of the Anti H-Block movement. She called on nationalists to vote for Bobby Sands in the 1981 by-election, which he won. She also controversially called on Fianna Fáil voters to give preference votes for Anti H-Block candidates in the 1981 general election.

She held her Dáil seat until the 1981 general election, when the constituency boundaries were redrawn. She sought re-election in the new constituency of Dublin South. This caused tension within the local Fianna Fáil party, for one of the other candidates, Séamus Brennan, was a prominent opponent of Haughey. De Valera polled relatively well but narrowly failed to be elected, losing to another Fianna Fáil candidate, Niall Andrews. She contested the constituency again at the February 1982 general election, but saw her vote drop, and once again failed to be elected.

At the November 1982 general election she decided not to seek re-election in Dublin South or in any Dublin constituency, transferring instead to the Clare constituency, where one of the sitting TDs, Bill Loughnane—a fellow supporter of Haughey—had died. Clare was the constituency that her grandfather Éamon de Valera had represented from 1917 to 1959. Again, she narrowly failed to be elected, but remained living in the constituency, and at the 1987 general election she was elected a TD for Clare. She was re-elected there at every election until her retirement in 2007.

De Valera resigned briefly from Fianna Fáil in 1993, due to the removal of the 'stopover' at Shannon Airport. She was persuaded to rejoin the party in 1994 by its new leader, Bertie Ahern; he then appointed her to the opposition front bench. In 1997, she became Minister for Arts, Heritage, Gaeltacht and the Islands. She introduced broadcasting legislation in 1999 to ensure that the public could continue to watch the most important sporting events on ordinary television. A speech given by De Valera in Boston about her fear of closer EU integration stimulated a debate on whether Ireland's economic and social values were closer to those of the USA or the EU, "Boston or Berlin". She lost her place in the cabinet in 2002, but was appointed as a Minister of State. Her government office was Minister of State at the Department of Education and Science, with special responsibility for Adult Education, Youth Affairs and Educational Disadvantage.

On 11 November 2005, she announced her intention to retire at the following election. She resigned as Minister of State on 8 December 2006, and was replaced by a member of another Irish political family, Seán Haughey.

See also
Families in the Oireachtas

References

External links

1954 births
Living people
Alumni of University College Dublin
De Valera family
Women government ministers of the Republic of Ireland
20th-century women MEPs for the Republic of Ireland
Fianna Fáil MEPs
Fianna Fáil TDs
Irish schoolteachers
Members of the 21st Dáil
Members of the 25th Dáil
Members of the 26th Dáil
Members of the 27th Dáil
Members of the 28th Dáil
Members of the 29th Dáil
20th-century women Teachtaí Dála
21st-century women Teachtaí Dála
MEPs for the Republic of Ireland 1979–1984
Ministers of State of the 29th Dáil
Politicians from Dublin (city)
Women ministers of state of the Republic of Ireland
People educated at Loreto College, Foxrock